Terry Steiner is an American wrestler and wrestling coach, who was an NCAA champion and three-time All-American. He is the women's U.S. National Coach for USA Wrestling. He led the U.S. women’s wrestling to a record four medals at the 2020 Tokyo Olympics: a Gold medal (Tamyra Mensah-Stock), a Silver medal (Adeline Gray) and two Bronze medals (Helen Maroulis and Sarah Hildebrandt).

Early life and education
Steiner is from Bismarck, North Dakota and wrestled at the University of Iowa alongside his identical twin, Troy Steiner, who also won an individual NCAA championship. Steiner was coached by Dan Gable, and placed third, fifth, and first in 1991, 1992, and 1993 respectively. He graduated from Iowa in 1993 with a B.A. in Social Work.

Coaching
Steiner has been the women's U.S. National Coach for USA Wrestling since 2002. In this capacity, Steiner has been the longtime coach of Adeline Gray, six-time world-champion (2012, 2014, 2015, 2018, 2019, 2021) and two-time (2016, 2020) Olympian.

Awards and honors
Steiner was inducted into the National Wrestling Hall of Fame in 2013.

References

Living people
American male sport wrestlers
American Olympic coaches
Sportspeople from Bismarck, North Dakota
Year of birth missing (living people)
Iowa Hawkeyes wrestlers
Twin sportspeople
American twins